Hour of Penance is a technical death metal band from Rome, Italy that was formed in 1999.

History
Their first demo came out in 2000 and was followed by their first album, Disturbance, released under Spanish label Xtreem Music in 2003. In 2005 the second album Pageantry for Martyrs was released under the same label. In 2008 the band released under Unique Leader records their first internationally recognized success The Vile Conception. This album set the coordinates for their sound, marked by a technical guitar riffing, blast beats and fast vocal lines. In 2010 their fourth album Paradogma was released, and while keeping the brutal approach of the previous work, their sound incorporated more melodic and black metal influences. The album was recognized by the press as one of the death metal highlights of the year and opened the road for a deal with the Los Angeles based label Prosthetic Records and a tour with Deicide. In 2012 the band released Sedition which was followed by various tours with Cannibal Corpse, The Black Dahlia Murder and Devildriver amongst the others. "Regicide" was released in 2014 and followed by further touring with Behemoth and Cannibal Corpse. The last album published with Prosthetic Records was Cast the First Stone, released in 2017. Hour of Penance then signed a deal with Polish label Agonia Records and released a new album called Misotheism on October 25, 2019.

Members

Current members
Paolo Pieri – vocals, guitars (2010–present)
Giulio Moschini – lead guitar (2004–present)
Marco Mastrobuono – bass (2013–present)
Davide "BrutalDave" Billia - Drums (2015–present)

Former members
Mike Viti – vocals, bass (1999–2004)
Alex Manco – vocals (2004–2006)
Francesco Paoli – vocals (2006–2010)
Francesco De Honestis – guitars (1999–2004) 
Enrico Schettino – guitars (1999–2006)
Stefano Morabito – guitars (2009–2010)
Silvano Leone – bass (2004–2013) 
Mauro Mercurio – drums (1999–2010)
Simone "Arconda" Piras – drums (2010–2012)
James Payne – drums (2012–2014)

Timeline

Discography

Studio albums
2003 – Disturbance (Xtreem Music)
2005 – Pageantry For Martyrs (Xtreem Music)
2008 – The Vile Conception (Unique Leader Records)
2010 – Paradogma (Unique Leader Records)
2012 – Sedition (Prosthetic Records)
2014 – Regicide (Prosthetic Records)
2017 - Cast The First Stone (Prosthetic Records)
2019 - Misotheism (Agonia Records)

Demos
2000 – Promo 2000
2007 – Promo 2007

External links
AllMusic
The Metal Archives
Official Site
Official Facebook

Italian death metal musical groups
Technical death metal musical groups
Musical groups from Rome
Musical groups established in 1999
1999 establishments in Italy